Jonathan Ware (born 1984) is an American pianist, Lied accompanist and academic teacher.

Life 
Born in Texas, Ware studied at the Eastman School of Music in Rochester, at the Juilliard School in New York City and at the Hochschule für Musik "Hanns Eisler". As a Lied accompanist, he has performed in major venues in Europe and the US, including with Benjamin Appl, Christiane Oelze, Golda Schultz, Elsa Dreisig and Ludwig Mittelhammer. For several years, he participated to the Heidelberger Frühling Festival Academy. He teaches at the Hanns Eisler Academy of Music and the Barenboim–Said Akademie in Berlin.

Awards 
 2014:  of the  – 1st prize.
 2012: International song competition "Das Lied" – Pianist award
 2011: Wigmore Hall / Kohn Foundation International Song Competition – Pianist award
 2005: Kingsville International Young Performer’s Competition – 1st prize
 2002: Missouri Southern International Piano Competition – 2nd prize
 2002: New York International Piano Competition – 4th prize

Recordings 
 2020: Morgen with Elsa Dreisig (Erato Records)
 2019: Schubert – Wolf – Medtner with Ludwig Mittelhammer (Berlin Classics)

References

External links 
 

American classical pianists
Classical accompanists
Academic staff of the Hochschule für Musik Hanns Eisler Berlin
1984 births
Living people
Musicians from Texas